The British Columbia Men's Premier League is a provincial rugby union competition currently contested by twelve clubs in British Columbia, Canada and one in the U.S. state of Washington. The BC Premier League is organized by the British Columbia Rugby Union.

The league currently consists of teams from the Lower Mainland, Vancouver Island and Washington state. Clubs play each other twice throughout the regular season. The top six teams are then seeded and qualify for two rounds of playoffs. The top two teams from the semi-finals then face each other at the BC Rugby Club Finals in May.

History
The teams compete for the prestigious Rounsefell Cup. The trophy was donated by F.W. Rounsefell, a Vancouver insurance broker and financier and former British Columbia rugby star. The Rounsefell Cup was first awarded to the Central Athletic Club in March 1922. The cup has been competed for annually ever since.

2018–19 Premier League Teams

Past Champions

 
1922 - Central Athletic Club
1923 - Vancouver Rowing Club
1924 - UBC Thunderbirds
1925 - James Bay Athletic Association
1926 - Ex King George
1927 - Ex King George
1928 - Ex King George
1929 - Meraloma Athletic Club
1930 - UBC Thunderbirds
1931 - Ex King George & The Canadian Scottish Regiment (Princess Mary's)
1932 - Not contested
1933 - North Shore All Blacks
1934 - North Shore All Blacks
1935 - North Shore All Blacks
1936 - Vancouver Rowing Club & The 5th Regiment
1937 - North Shore All Blacks
1938 - James Bay Athletic Association
1939 - Meraloma Athletic Club & JBAA
1940 - James Bay Athletic Association
1941 - Meraloma Athletic Club
1942 - Ex Lord Byng
1943 - Royal Canadian Naval College
1944 - Army Victoria
1945 - UBC Thunderbirds
1946 - James Bay Athletic Association
1947 - UBC Thunderbirds
1948 - North Shore All Blacks
1949 - Ex South Burnaby
1950 - Ex Britannia (Brit Lions Rugby Club)
1951 - Vindex RFC
1952 - Vindex RFC
1953 - Vindex RFC
1954 - Meraloma Athletic Club
1955 - North Shore All Blacks
1956 - Kats Rugby Club
1957 - Kats Rugby Club
1958 - Kats Rugby Club
1959 - Kats Rugby Club
1960 - Oak Bay Wanderers
1961 - Kats Rugby Club 
1962 - Kats Rugby Club & Oak Bay Wanderers
1963 - Kats Rugby Club & JBAA
1964 - Kats Rugby Club
1965 - Meraloma Athletic Club
1966 - Kats Rugby Club 
1967 - Meraloma Athletic Club
1968 - Kats Rugby Club
1969 - Kats Rugby Club
1970 - Kats Rugby Club
1971 - University of Victoria Vikes
1972 - Meraloma Athletic Club
1973 - Meraloma Athletic Club
1974 - James Bay Athletic Association
1975 - James Bay Athletic Association
1976 - James Bay Athletic Association
1977 - James Bay Athletic Association
1978 - James Bay Athletic Association
1979 - James Bay Athletic Association
1980 - James Bay Athletic Association
1981 - UBC Old Boys Ravens
1982 - James Bay Athletic Association
1983 - Meraloma Athletic Club
1984 - Ex Britannia (Brit Lions Rugby Club)
1985 - UBC Old Boys Ravens
1986 - Meraloma Athletic Club
1987 - Meraloma Athletic Club
1988 - Meraloma Athletic Club
1989 - James Bay Athletic Association
1990 - UBC Old Boys Ravens
1991 - UBC Old Boys Ravens
1992 - James Bay Athletic Association
1993 - James Bay Athletic Association
1994 - UBC Old Boys Ravens
1995 - Vancouver Rowing Club
1996 - James Bay Athletic Association
1997 - Cowichan RFC
1998 - Cowichan RFC
1999 - James Bay Athletic Association
2000 - Castaway Wanderers RFC
2001 - Castaway Wanderers RFC
2002 - Castaway Wanderers RFC
2003 - University of Victoria Vikes
2004 - Capilano RFC
2005 - Capilano RFC
2006 - James Bay Athletic Association
2007 - James Bay Athletic Association
2008 - James Bay Athletic Association
2009 - Meraloma Athletic Club
2010 - University of Victoria Vikes
2011 - Castaway Wanderers RFC
2012 - Capilano RFC
2013 - James Bay Athletic Association
2014 - James Bay Athletic Association
2015 - UBC Thunderbirds
2016 - UBC Thunderbirds
2017 - UBC Thunderbirds
2018 - UBC Old Boys Ravens
2019 - UBC Old Boys Ravens
2020 - Not contested due to COVID-19 
2021 - Not contested due to COVID-19 
2022 - UBC Thunderbirds

Awards

Player of the Year

See also
Rugby Canada
British Columbia Rugby Union
Coastal Cup

References

External links
Rugby Canada
British Columbia Rugby Union

Rugby union leagues in Canada
Rugby union in British Columbia
Rugby union